Park Farm Down or Parkfarm Down is a  biological Site of Special Scientific Interest north-west of Lambourn in Berkshire. It is in the North Wessex Downs, which is an Area of Outstanding Natural Beauty.

Geography

The site features an area of scattered sarsen stones which are now extremely rare on the Berkshire Downs.

Fauna

The site has the following Fauna:

Lychens

Buellia saxorum
Candelariella coralliza
Ramalina siliquosa

References

Sites of Special Scientific Interest in Berkshire
Lambourn